The Jalisco Philharmonic Orchestra (Spanish: Orquesta Filarmónica de Jalisco) is a Mexican orchestra. It was established in 1912 by José Rolón as the Guadalajara Symphonic Orchestra in Guadalajara, Jalisco in Mexico. The Orchestra resides at Teatro Degollado located in the historic district of Guadalajara.

It has been conducted by Enrique Bátiz, Neeme Järvi, Plácido Domingo, Mu-Hai Tang, Claudio Abbado, Antal Doráti, Eduardo Mata and Charles Dutoit. Alondra de la Parra was the artistic director from 2012 to 2013. Jesús Medina debuted as the orchestra's music director in February of 2019.

References

External links
 La Orquesta Filarmónica de Jalisco

Musical groups established in 1912
Mexican orchestras
1912 establishments in Mexico